Prestonella nuptialis is a species of air-breathing land snail, a terrestrial pulmonate gastropod mollusc in the family Bothriembryontidae.

It was previously classified within Prestonellidae. cf.

Distribution
This species is endemic to Eastern Cape, South Africa.

The type locality is Craigie Burn, Somerset East, South Africa.

Description

Prestonella nuptialis was described by two British malacologists James Cosmo Melvill (1845-1929) and John Henry Ponsonby-Fane (1848-1916) in 1894. The type description reads in Latin and the English language as follows:

The width of the shell of the type species is 8.5 mm. The height of the shell is 15 mm.

References
This article incorporates public domain text from the reference

External links 
 

Endemic fauna of South Africa
Bothriembryontidae
Gastropods described in 1894